They Only Come Out at Night is 1984 dance single by Peter Brown.  The single was his first number one on the dance chart, where it stayed  for one week.  "They Only Come Out at Night", also peaked at number fifty on the soul singles chart, but unlike previous Peter Brown entries, it did not make the Hot 100.  It did, however, reach No. 102 on the Billboard Bubbling Under the Hot 100 chart.

Personnel
Credits are adapted from the album's liner notes.

 Pat Hurley, Robert Rans Backing Vocals
 John "Jellybean" Benitez  Mixed
 Melanie West  Engineer Assistant 
 Michael Hutchinson  Remix

Formats and track listings

12" Columbia – 44-04957 (US)
 "They Only Come Out At Night" – 	6:15
 "They Only Come Out At Night (Instrumental)" – 	4:46

7" Columbia – 38-04981 (US)
 "They Only Come Out At Night" – 4:05
 "	They Only Come Out At Night (Instrumental)" – 4:50

7" CBS – CBSA 4334, CBS – A 4334 (Europe)
 "They Only Come Out At Night" – 4:23
 "They Only Come Out At Night (Instrumental)" – 4:50

7" CBS – Sony Records – 07SP 807 (Japan)
 "They Only Come Out At Night" – 4:05
 "They Only Come Out At Night (Instrumental)" – 4:50

Charts

References

1984 singles
1984 songs